Currently, eight countries maintain consulates-general in Jerusalem:  Belgium, France, Greece, Italy, Spain, Sweden, Turkey, and the United Kingdom. The Consulate General of the United States in Jerusalem was merged into the Embassy of the United States in 2018. To this list, one usually includes the Vatican (Holy See), which maintains an "Apostolic Delegation to Jerusalem and Palestine" in Jerusalem.

Traditionally, these consulates are not regarded by their sending countries as diplomatic missions to either Israel or the Palestinian Authority. The heads of these missions do not submit letters of credence to either the Israeli president or the Palestinian president. All countries maintaining consulates-general in Jerusalem maintain their embassies in Tel Aviv, and it is the ambassador in Tel Aviv that presents letters of credence to the president of Israel. The Consul General of Turkey in Jerusalem also presents letters of credence to the Palestinian president, being also accredited as Ambassador of Turkey to the State of Palestine.

History
Having consulates-general in Jerusalem not accredited to any foreign government is a result of the unresolved issue of the status of Jerusalem. Under the United Nations Partition Plan of 1947, Jerusalem was to become a corpus separatum under international control, separate from both the Jewish state and the Arab one whose creation the partition plan envisaged; that would have logically entailed various countries having a separate diplomatic representation in Jerusalem. While the corpus separatum idea was never implemented, the status of Jerusalem remains disputed and unresolved. The international community never recognized the declaration of Jerusalem as Israel's capital in 1949 or the annexation of East Jerusalem to Israel in 1967. Thus the anomalous Jerusalem consulates serve as a convenient way for various countries to have a diplomatic presence in the city without recognizing such Israeli "accomplished facts".

The United States maintained a consulate general in Jerusalem between 1844 and 2019, which later become responsible for conducting relations with Palestinians living in Jerusalem, the West Bank, and the Gaza Strip. After the United States relocated its Embassy from Tel Aviv to Jerusalem in May 2018, the United States Secretary of State Mike Pompeo announced that the Consulate General would be merged into the Embassy. In early March 2019, the Consulate General was formally merged into the US Embassy, ending the US practice of accrediting separate missions to the Israelis and Palestinians. Most of its former responsibilities were assumed by a new Palestinian Affairs Unit inside the Embassy.

List of missions
All countries with consulates-general in Jerusalem include the contacts with the Palestinian National Authority in the consulate-general's responsibilities. All countries with consulates-general in Jerusalem have separate embassies in Tel Aviv that are accredited to Israel.
, in East Jerusalem
, Consulate General of France in West Jerusalem
, with offices in West Jerusalem (listed under "Israel" on Ministry of Foreign Affairs website) and in East Jerusalem
 (Apostolic Delegation to Jerusalem and Palestine), in East Jerusalem
, with offices in both East and West Jerusalem
, in East Jerusalem
, in East Jerusalem
, in East Jerusalem; the Turkish Consul General in Jerusalem is also accredited as the Ambassador of Turkey to the State of Palestine
, in East Jerusalem; it "provides services" for "Jerusalem and the Palestinian territories"

Several more countries are represented by Jerusalem-based honorary consuls.

Former missions
// Germany, former German Consulate-General on 57, Street of the Prophets in western Jerusalem (Closed in 1939)
 - Consulate General of the United States in Jerusalem: merged into the Embassy of the United States in 2018

See also
 List of diplomatic missions in Israel
 List of diplomatic missions in Palestine

References

Israel diplomacy-related lists
Jerusalem-related lists
State of Palestine-related lists